The 2021–22 Seton Hall Pirates men's basketball team represented Seton Hall University in the 2021–22 NCAA Division I men's basketball season. They were led by 12th-year head coach Kevin Willard. The Pirates played their home games at the Prudential Center in Newark, New Jersey and Walsh Gymnasium in South Orange, New Jersey as members of the Big East Conference. They finished the season 21–11, 11–8 in Big East play to finish a tie for fifth place. They defeated Georgetown in the first round of the Big East tournament before losing in the quarterfinals to UConn. They received an at-large bid to the NCAA tournament as the No. 8 seed in the South region where they lost in the first round to TCU.

On March 21, 2022, head coach Kevin Willard left to become the new basketball coach at Maryland. On March 31, the school named Saint Peter's head coach and former Pirate player Shaheen Holloway the team's new coach.

Previous season 
In a season limited due to the ongoing COVID-19 pandemic, the Pirates finished the 2020–21 season 14–13, 10–9 in Big East play to finish in a tie for fourth place. As the No. 5 seed in the Big East tournament, they defeated St. John's in the quarterfinals before losing to Georgetown in the semifinals.

Offseason

Departures

Incoming transfers

Roster

Schedule and results 

|-
! colspan=9 style=| Exhibition

|-
! colspan=9 style=| Non-conference regular season

|-
!colspan=9 style=|Big East regular season

|-
!colspan=9 style="|Big East tournament

|-
!colspan=9 style="|NCAA tournament

Rankings

Awards and honors

Big East Conference honors

All-Big East First Team
Jared Rhoden

Source

References 

Seton Hall
Seton Hall
Seton Hall
Seton Hall Pirates men's basketball seasons
Seton Hall